Ritchie Kitoko (born 11 June 1988) is a Belgian professional footballer who plays as a defensive midfielder for Greek Super League 2 club Olympiacos Volos.

Club career
Born in Kinshasa, Zaire, Kitoko moved to Belgium in his teens, entering Standard Liège's youth system in 2004. Two years later he signed his first professional contract, with Albacete Balompié in Spain, spending almost two full seasons with the B-team in the fourth division.

On 20 August 2009, Kitoko joined Udinese Calcio in Serie A. However, on 2 January of the following year, he returned to Spain and signed for Granada CF on loan until the end of the campaign in the third level, as the Andalusians had recently signed a partnership agreement with the Italians; he contributed with 13 games (12 starts) as his team returned to the second tier after an absence of more than 20 years.

On 31 January 2011, deemed surplus to requirements at Granada, Kitoko moved to another club in the same country and division, CD Tenerife, still owned by Udinese. He appeared regularly as a starter during his short spell, but the Canary Islands side eventually suffered relegation, a second consecutive.

An unassuming two-year spell in the Superleague Greece with Asteras Tripolis F.C. notwithstanding, Kitoko continued competing in Spain's level two in the following years.

International career
After choosing to play for Belgium internationally, Kitoko represented the nation in various youth levels. In May 2009 he earned his first call-up to the senior team, for the Kirin Cup, but did not appear in the tournament.

References

External links

1988 births
Living people
Belgian sportspeople of Democratic Republic of the Congo descent
Democratic Republic of the Congo emigrants to Belgium
Footballers from Kinshasa
Democratic Republic of the Congo footballers
Belgian footballers
Association football midfielders
Segunda División players
Segunda División B players
Tercera División players
Atlético Albacete players
Albacete Balompié players
Granada CF footballers
CD Tenerife players
Girona FC players
Real Jaén footballers
UCAM Murcia CF players
Racing de Santander players
Udinese Calcio players
Super League Greece players
Asteras Tripolis F.C. players
Apollon Smyrnis F.C. players
Belgium youth international footballers
Belgium under-21 international footballers
Democratic Republic of the Congo expatriate footballers
Belgian expatriate footballers
Expatriate footballers in Spain
Expatriate footballers in Greece
Belgian expatriate sportspeople in Spain
Belgian expatriate sportspeople in Greece